Carnota  is a parish of the municipality of Alenquer, in western Portugal. The population in 2011 was 1,678, in an area of 18.09 km².

References

Parishes of Alenquer, Portugal